The prime minister of Lithuania ("Minister-Chairman") is the head of the government of Lithuania. The prime minister is Lithuania's head of government and is appointed by the president with the assent of the Lithuanian parliament, the Seimas. The modern office of prime minister was established in 1990, when Lithuania declared its independence, although the official title was "Chairperson of the Council of Ministers" until 25 November 1992.

Historically, the title of prime minister was also used between 1918 and 1940. This was during the original Republic of Lithuania, which lasted from the collapse of the Russian Empire until the country's annexation by the Soviet Union.

Republic of Lithuania (1918–1940)

Following the ultimatum in June 1940, the forces of Soviet Union entered Lithuania, prompting President Antanas Smetona to flee the country. Antanas Merkys, who assumed the position of acting president in accordance with the constitution, soon announced he had taken over the Presidency on a permanent basis and appointed Justas Paleckis, favored by the Soviet authorities, as the Prime Minister ahead of the "people's government". Merkys soon resigned, allowing Paleckis to assume the post of acting president as well. The presidency of Merkys is not recognized as legitimate in modern Lithuania and Paleckis is not listed as an interwar Prime Minister in government sources.

Lithuanian Soviet Socialist Republic (1940–1990)
Chairman of the Council of People's Commissars of the Lithuanian SSR
Mečislovas Gedvilas (25 August 1940 – 2 April 1946) (in exile in the Russian SFSR 1941–1944)

Chairmen of the Council of Ministers of the Lithuanian SSR
Mečislovas Gedvilas (2 April 1946 – 16 January 1956)
Motiejus Šumauskas (16 January 1956 – 14 April 1967)
Juozas Maniušis (14 April 1967 – 16 January 1981)
Ringaudas Songaila (16 January 1981 – 18 November 1985)
Vytautas Sakalauskas (18 November 1985 – 17 March 1990)

Provisional Government of Lithuania (1941)
Acting Prime Minister of the Provisional Government
Juozas Ambrazevičius (June 23, 1941 – August 5, 1941)

Republic of Lithuania (1990–present)

List of Prime Ministers (1990–present) 
From 11 March 1990 after adopting the Act of the Re-Establishment of the State of Lithuania.

Political parties and affiliations:

See also
 Lists of office-holders

Notes

References

External links
 Official site

 
Lithuania, Prime Minister of
Lists of political office-holders in Lithuania